Alexia Barrier (born 26 November 1979 in Paris) is a French sailor who competed in the 2020–2021 Vendee Globe. Competing with the oldest boat in the fleet and only securing sufficient funding months before the start she completed the race in 111 days, 17 hours, 03 minutes.

Biography
She studied Sports Management at Nice University of Sports, UFR-STAPS.

Results

References

External links
 Vendee Campaign Website 
 Alexia Barrier Café du Cycliste CARAVAN ambassador 
 

1979 births
Living people
Sportspeople from Paris
French female sailors (sport)
Class 40 class sailors
IMOCA 60 class sailors
French Vendee Globe sailors
2020 Vendee Globe sailors
Vendée Globe finishers
Single-handed circumnavigating sailors
21st-century French women